The Lame–Smith House and the Sydney and Gertrude Smith Barn (also known as James Alexander Smith and Elmarion Smith Barn), about one mile northwest of Halsey, Oregon, are historic structures that were listed on the National Register of Historic Places in 1999.

It was built to house horses being raised for fire and police departments of the Pacific Northwest. Its ornamented cupolas were assessed to be the finest in Linn County.

The farmhouse has Gothic Revival features and was built in c.1864 by Joseph Lame and was enlarged in c.1884 for the J.A. Smith family. This property is mainly constructed of timber. Also on the property are an automobile garage (1994), a wood-frame pump house (1940s), and metal equipment shed (1960s).  To the west of the house, in 1998, was a very large Black walnut tree, likely the largest in Linn County.

In 1998 the nearby fields were being used to grow grass seed.

References

Houses on the National Register of Historic Places in Oregon
Gothic Revival architecture in Oregon
Houses completed in 1864
Houses in Linn County, Oregon
1864 establishments in Oregon
National Register of Historic Places in Linn County, Oregon